Jalen Myrick (born February 27, 1995) is a former American football cornerback. He played college football at Minnesota, and was drafted by the Jacksonville Jaguars in the seventh round of the 2017 NFL Draft.

High school
Myrick attended Savannah Christian Preparatory School in Savannah, Georgia. He played football and ran track in high school with personal bests of 10.61 and 22.15 seconds in the 100 and 200 meters, respectively.

College career
Myrick played at Minnesota from 2013 to 2016. During his career he had 93 tackles, five interceptions and two touchdowns.

Professional career
Myrick's 4.28 in the 40-yard dash marked the fastest time out of all the defensive backs at the 2017 NFL Combine.

Jacksonville Jaguars
The Jacksonville Jaguars selected Myrick in the seventh round (222nd overall) in the 2017 NFL Draft. On May 11, the Jaguars signed Myrick to a four-year, $2.49 million contract with a signing bonus of $93,666. On December 24, 2017, Myrick blocked an extra point attempt by the San Francisco 49ers that was returned to the end zone for two points.

On September 1, 2018, Myrick was waived by the Jaguars.

Minnesota Vikings
On September 5, 2018, Myrick was signed to the Minnesota Vikings' practice squad. He was released on October 16, 2018, but was re-signed a week later. He was released again on October 27, 2018. He was re-signed to the practice squad on November 27, 2018. He signed a reserve/future contract with the Vikings on January 2, 2019. He was waived on April 11, 2019.

Atlanta Falcons
On August 18, 2019, Myrick signed with the Atlanta Falcons. However, he was waived on August 31 during final roster cuts.

DC Defenders
Myrick was drafted in the 3rd round during phase four in the 2020 XFL Draft by the DC Defenders. He was placed on injured reserve on January 31, 2020. He was waived from injured reserve on March 7, 2020.

References

External links
Minnesota Golden Gophers bio

1995 births
Living people
Players of American football from Savannah, Georgia
American football cornerbacks
Minnesota Golden Gophers football players
People from Chatham County, Georgia
Atlanta Falcons players
Jacksonville Jaguars players
Minnesota Vikings players
DC Defenders players